Darren Britt (born 9 October 1969) is an Australian former rugby league footballer who played as a  in the 1990s and 2000s. 

He played for Western Suburbs and the Canterbury-Bankstown Bulldogs in the NRL. He also represented the Australian national side.

Background
Britt was born in Orange, New South Wales, Australia.

Career
Britt captained Canterbury in 92 first grade matches in 1996 and on a full-time basis during 1998-2001, second only to Terry Lamb who led them on 120 occasions.

Britt played at prop forward and captained the Canterbury-Bankstown Bulldogs in their loss at the 1998 NRL grand final to the Brisbane Broncos. Britt was selected for the Australian team to compete in the end of season 1999 Rugby League Tri-Nations tournament. In the final against New Zealand he played at prop forward in the Kangaroos' 22-20 victory.

Britt played two seasons in the Super League with English club St. Helens in 2002 and 2003. Having won Super League VI, St Helens contested the 2003 World Club Challenge against 2002 NRL Premiers, the Sydney Roosters.

Since retirement he has served on the NRL Judiciary.

References

External links
Bulldogs profile
NRL Profile
Orange Sporting Hall of Fame
Saints Heritage Society profile

1969 births
Living people
Australia national rugby league team players
Australian rugby league players
Australian expatriate sportspeople in England
Canterbury-Bankstown Bulldogs players
Country New South Wales Origin rugby league team players
Rugby league players from Orange, New South Wales
Rugby league props
St Helens R.F.C. players
Western Suburbs Magpies players